Phra Phrom is a district (amphoe) of Nakhon Si Thammarat province, southern Thailand.

Geography
Neighboring districts are (from the north clockwise): Mueang Nakhon Si Thammarat, Chaloem Phra Kiat, Ron Phibun, and Lan Saka.

History
The district was created as a minor district (king amphoe) on 30 April 1994 by splitting off four tambons from Mueang Nakhon Si Thammarat district. On 11 October 1997 the minor district was upgraded to a full district.

Administration
The district is divided into four sub-districts (tambons), which are further subdivided into 38 villages (mubans). There are no municipal (thesaban) areas, and four tambon administrative organizations (TAO).

References

External links
amphoe.com

Districts of Nakhon Si Thammarat province